A diurea is an organic compound containing two urea units. This may refer to:
 Methylene diurea
 Ethylene diurea
 Isobutylidenediurea
 Crotonylidene diurea